The University of Northampton was based in Northampton, England, from 1261 to 1265.

The university was established by royal charter after approval from King Henry III in 1261. It was the third university in England, after Oxford and Cambridge, and the 22nd in Europe. After being advised by bishops and magnates that Northampton was a threat to Oxford, Henry III dissolved the university in 1265, and signed a Royal Decree that banned the establishment of a university in Northampton.

In 2005 the decree was repealed by the Privy Council, allowing the then University College Northampton (founded in 1924) to gain university status and become the University of Northampton.

History

Founding

Northampton was, in the 13th century, a far more important town than is evident today, so it is not particularly surprising that a university was established there. The town was also, briefly, the King's seat.

The antecedents of the University of Northampton are in a school founded in the reign of King Richard I. Richard patronised the institution and, according to at least one historian, between 1176 and 1193 the school at Northampton ‘rivalled or even eclipsed the Oxford schools’. The school lost a powerful supporter with the death of King Richard.

In the 13th century, through the reign of King John and his son Henry III, the nascent university gained the patronage of Simon de Montfort.

In 1261, with the approval of Henry III, the university was granted a royal charter.

Abolition
The existence of the university was brief. In 1265, four years after it was established, Henry III revoked the town's licence to have a university.

One factor in this may have been the participation of scholars in opposition to the King's forces during the Siege of Northampton in April 1264, when Henry III's forces besieged the supporters of Simon de Montfort, patron of the university, in Northampton Castle.

Sources from the time suggest that opposition from the University of Oxford was also a significant factor.  Henry wrote to the mayors and burgesses of Northampton on 1 February 1265, saying:

Modern University of Northampton
The university's name was revived in 2005 when the then University College Northampton, itself an amalgam of earlier institutions, was upgraded to full university status and renamed the University of Northampton. Other than the name and the location in the town, there is no link between the medieval university and the modern university.

See also
Medieval university
List of medieval universities
Stamford University (England)
Third-oldest university in England debate

References

External links
 University of Northampton history and dates

Buildings and structures in Northampton
History of Northampton
Northampton, University of (thirteenth century)
Northampton, University of (thirteenth century)
13th century in England
Ancient universities
1261 establishments in England
Educational institutions established in the 13th century
Henry III of England